Khalil Davis (born August 22, 1996) is an American football defensive tackle who is a free agent. He played college football at Nebraska.

College career
A four-star recruit, Davis committed to Nebraska over offers from Arkansas, Indiana, and Oregon, among other schools. He made 11 starts in 47 games. He was named the Cornhuskers' Defensive Lineman of the Year in both 2018 and 2019 seasons, after recording 11.0 sacks and 26 tackles for loss. He had eight sacks as a senior and led Nebraska with 45 tackles.

Professional career

Tampa Bay Buccaneers
At the NFL Combine, Davis ran the 40-yard dash in 4.75 seconds, the sixth-fastest time for a defensive lineman. He was selected with the 194th overall pick of the 2020 NFL Draft by the Tampa Bay Buccaneers. Davis earned a Super Bowl championship when the Buccaneers won Super Bowl LV.

On October 2, 2021, Davis was waived by the Buccaneers.

Indianapolis Colts
On October 5, 2021, the Indianapolis Colts claimed Davis off waivers. On October 30, 2021, Davis was waived by the Colts.

Pittsburgh Steelers
On November 2, 2021, Davis was signed to the Pittsburgh Steelers practice squad. He signed a reserve/future contract with the Steelers on January 18, 2022.

On August 30, 2022, Davis was waived by the Steelers.

Tampa Bay Buccaneers (second stint)
On September 21, 2022, Davis was signed to the Tampa Bay Buccaneers practice squad. He was released on November 29.

Los Angeles Rams
On December 14, 2022, Davis signed with the practice squad of the Los Angeles Rams. His practice squad contract expired when the team's season ended on January 9, 2023.

NFL career statistics

Personal life
Davis is the twin brother of Carlos Davis. Khalil and Carlos were adopted by their parents Carl and Tracy Davis when they were nine months old.

References

External links
Tampa Bay Buccaneers bio
Nebraska Cornhuskers bio

1996 births
Living people
Twin sportspeople
Players of American football from Missouri
Sportspeople from the Kansas City metropolitan area
People from Blue Springs, Missouri
American football defensive tackles
Nebraska Cornhuskers football players
Tampa Bay Buccaneers players
Nebraska Cornhuskers men's track and field athletes
Indianapolis Colts players
Pittsburgh Steelers players
Los Angeles Rams players